Changes Come is a live album by Over the Rhine, released in 2004, documenting their 2003 tour in support of Ohio.

Track listing
All songs written by Karin Bergquist and Linford Detweiler, except Ain't No Sunshine, written by Bill Withers.  "Lifelong Sunshine" is a medley of "Lifelong Fling" and "Ain't No Sunshine."

"Spinning
"Show Me
"She
"Nobody Number One
"Suitcase
"Lifelong Sunshine
"Ohio
"All I Need Is Everything
"The World Can Wait
"When I Go
"B.P.D.
"Cruel and Pretty
"Changes Come

Notes
All tracks were recorded at 12th and Porter, Nashville, TN, October 19, 2003. 
The album omits two songs: "Bothered" and "Long Lost Brother," but otherwise follows the original setlist of the show.

Personnel

Karin Bergquist - Voice, Acoustic Guitar, Piano
Linford Detweiler - Piano, Organ, Wurli
Paul Moak - Acoustic and Electric Guitars, Pedal Steel, Sitar, Backing Vocals
Rick Plant - Bass
Will Sayler - Drums

References

Over the Rhine (band) albums
2004 live albums